Balaraju Katha is a 1970 Indian Telugu-language drama film written by Mullapudi Venkata Ramana and directed by Bapu. It is a remake of the 1969 Tamil film Vaa Raja Vaa, and has won the Nandi Award for Best Feature Film (bronze).

Plot 
This is the story of a young boy Balaraju (Master Prabhakar) in a historical town Mahabalipuram. He becomes a tourist guide to support his entire family. An elderly childless couple takes a liking to him and wants to adopt him. The story is the results of his ordeals.

Cast 
 Master Prabhakar as Balaraju
 Nagabhushanam
 Suryakantham
 Dhulipala
 Mikkilineni
 Allu Ramalingaiah
 Baby Sumathi
 Sakshi Ranga Rao
 Hemalatha
 Raavi Kondala Rao
 Pushpa Kumari

Soundtrack 
Soundtrack was composed by K. V. Mahadevan.
 "Adiganani Anukovaddu Cheppakunda Dateyoddu" -
 "Cheppu Cheppu Bhai Jarigedi Vippi Cheppu" -
 "Choodu Choodu Tamasha Bhale Tamasha Aidu Vella Tamasha" -
 "Hippie Hippie Aadapillalo Veellu Chepparani Goppa Goppa Tarajuvvalo" -
 "Mahabalipuram...Bharateeya Kalajagatikidi Goppa Gopuram" -
 "Okati Rendu Moodaite Muddu Antaku Minchina Santanamaite Vaddu" -

Awards 
The film won Nandi Award for Third Best Feature Film – Bronze – 1970

References

External links 
 

1970 films
1970s children's films
1970s Telugu-language films
Films directed by Bapu
Films scored by K. V. Mahadevan
Films with screenplays by A. P. Nagarajan
Indian black-and-white films
Indian children's films
Telugu remakes of Tamil films